County Waterford is a county in Ireland. It is in the province of Munster and is part of the South-East Region. It is named after the city of Waterford. Waterford City and County Council is the local authority for the county. The population of the county at large, including the city, was 116,176 according to the 2016 census. The county is based on the historic Gaelic territory of the Déise. There is an Irish-speaking area, Gaeltacht na nDéise, in the south-west of the county.

Geography and subdivisions

County Waterford has two mountain ranges, the Knockmealdown Mountains and the Comeragh Mountains. It also has many rivers, including Ireland's third-longest river, the River Suir; and Ireland's fourth-longest river, the Munster Blackwater. There are over 30 beaches along Waterford's volcanic coastline. A large stretch of this coastline, known as the Copper Coast, has been designated as a UNESCO Geopark, a place of great geological importance. To the west of Dungarvan is the Déise Gaeltacht, an Irish-speaking region comprising the areas of Ring, County Waterford and Old Parish.

Waterford City is the county seat; prior to the merger of the 2 Waterford authorities in June 2014 Dungarvan was the county seat for Waterford County Council.

Baronies
There are eight historic baronies in the county: Coshmore and Coshbride, Decies-within-Drum, Decies-without-Drum, Gaultiere, Glenahiry, Middlethird, Upperthird and Waterford City.

Largest towns

History

County Waterford is colloquially known as "The Déise", pronounced "day-shah" or, in Irish, /dʲe:ʃʲɪ/ . Some time between the 4th and 8th centuries, an Irish tribe called the Déisi were driven from southern county Meath/north Kildare and moved into the Waterford region, conquering and settling there. The ancient principality of the Déise is today roughly coterminous with the current Roman Catholic Diocese of Waterford and Lismore thus including part of south County Tipperary.

The westernmost of the baronies are Decies-within-Drum and Decies-without-Drum, separated by the Drum-Fineen hills.

There are many megalithic tombs and ogham stones in the county. The Viking influence can still be seen with Reginald's Tower, one of the first buildings to use a brick and mortar construction method in Ireland. It was the largest settlement outside Scandinavia and the only large-scale 9th-century Viking settlement discovered to date in Western Europe. Other architectural features are products of the Anglo-Norman invasion of Ireland and its effects.

Local government and politics
As of 1 June 2014, Waterford City and County Council is the local government authority for the local government area of Waterford City and County. The authority was formed following the merger of the local government areas of the county of Waterford and the city of Waterford under the Local Government Reform Act 2014, and succeeded the functions of Waterford City Council and Waterford County Council. The local authority is responsible for certain local services such as sanitation, planning and real-estate development, libraries, the collection of automobile taxation, local roads and social housing.

For elections to Dáil Éireann, the county is represented by the 4-seat constituency of Waterford. For European elections, the city and county are part of the 5-seat South constituency.

Gaeltacht 

See also

High Sheriff of County Waterford
Lord Lieutenant of Waterford
List of abbeys and priories in the Republic of Ireland (County Waterford)
Saint Declan
Limerick–Rosslare railway line

References

External links

Waterford City and County Council website
– Official Waterford Tourism website

 
Waterford
Waterford
Waterford